Henry H. Hannon, Jr. (August 21, 1882 – December 10, 1958) was a Negro leagues outfielder and manager who played from 1908 to 1914 and later managed the Montgomery Grey Sox.

References

External links

1882 births
1958 deaths
Negro league baseball managers
Cuban Giants players
French Lick Plutos players
Philadelphia Giants players
St. Louis Giants players
Chicago Giants players
Louisville White Sox (1914-1915) players
Montgomery Grey Sox players
Sportspeople from Montgomery, Alabama
Baseball players from Montgomery, Alabama
20th-century African-American people